"Where It's At" is a song by American alternative rock musician Beck. It was released as the first single from his fifth album, Odelay (1996). Beck wrote the song in 1995 and premiered it at Lollapalooza the same year, in a version very similar to its incarnation on Odelay. He has performed the song often since 1995, frequently experimenting with the music and lyrics.

Production
"Where It's At" has a number of spoken samples that Beck and the Dust Brothers incorporated into it. Many of these come from an obscure sex education album titled Sex for Teens: (Where It's At), a subtitle Beck borrowed (see link below). Other vocal samples incorporated into "Where It's At" come from "Needle to the Groove" by old-school hip hop group Mantronix ("we've got two turntables and a microphone..."), as well as The Frogs ("that was a good drum break"). The song also references Gary Wilson, one of Beck's influences. In addition, just before the Frogs sample begins, the song incorporates a musical sample from the intro of noted go-go band E.U.'s song "Knock Him Out Sugar Ray".

Beck also pays homage to Captain Beefheart by dressing as Captain Beefheart was dressed in the Trout Mask Replica album photo sessions at 1:27 in the video.

Beck earned the Grammy Award for Best Male Rock Vocal Performance for the song. In October 2011, NME placed it at number 76 on its list of 150 Best Tracks of the Past 15 Years.

Critical reception
Justin Chadwick from Albumism said "Where It's At" is "the most memorable" song among the singles of the Odelay album. He added, "Propelled by a cacophony of distorted melodies, oddball vocal snippets, and the unforgettable chorus chant of “Where it’s at! I’ve got two turntables and a microphone”, with a robotic echo lifted from Mantronix’s 1985 single “Needle to the Groove”, Beck gives you little choice but to wholeheartedly accept his invitation to the “destination a little up the road”." Paul Verna from Billboard noted that "he takes a more straightforward tack, floating stream-of-consciousness raps over sampled beats." Daina Darzin from Cash Box picked it as Pick of the Week, noting that fans of "Loser" "should be equally happy with this". She wrote, "Jazzy, loopy keyboards, hip hop rhythms, psychedelic swirls of sixties-ish sound, and a happy, party-hearty groove make this a possible add for urban as well as modern rock stations." 

In 2012, Paste ranked the song number two on their list of the 20 greatest Beck songs, and in 2020, The Guardian ranked the song number seven on their list of the 30 greatest Beck songs.

Music video
The accompanying music video for "Where It's At" was directed by Steve Hanft. It features Beck doing a variety of things, such as cleaning up a highway for community service as a convict, singing at a car dealership, dressed as the Candyman, and line dancing. In one moment, Beck pays homage to William Shatner's performance of "Rocket Man" at the 1977 Saturn Awards ceremony. "Where It's At" was the first music video to be broadcast on MTV2 on August 1, 1996. The video was awarded a MTV Video Music Award for Best Male Video.  The shorter version was used for this video instead of the album version.

Track listings

 US 12-inch
 "Where It's At" (edit)
 "Make Out City"
 "Where It's At" (remix by Mario C and Mickey P)
 "Where It's At" (remix by John King)
 "Bonus Beats"

 UK CD1
 "Where It's At" (edit)
 "Where It's At" (remix by Mario C and Mickey P)
 "Bonus Beats"
 "Where It's At" (remix by U.N.K.L.E.)

 UK CD2 and Australian CD
 "Where It's At" (edit)
 "Where It's At" (remix by Mario C and Mickey P)
 "Bonus Beats"

 Japan
 "Where It's At" (edit)
 "Where It's At" (remix by John King)
 "Lloyd Price Express" (remix by John King)
 "Dark and Lovely" (remix by the Dust Brothers)
 "American Wasteland"
 "Clock"

Personnel
 Beck Hansen – vocals, electric piano, guitar, bass, organ
 The Dust Brothers – turntables
 Mike Boito – trumpet, organ
 Money Mark – organ
 David Brown – saxophone
 Eddie Lopez – outro talking

Charts

Weekly charts

Year-end charts

Release history

References

1996 songs
1996 singles
Beck songs
DGC Records singles
Geffen Records singles
Grammy Award for Best Male Rock Vocal Performance
MTV Video Music Award for Best Male Video
Song recordings produced by Dust Brothers
Songs written by Beck
Songs written by John King (record producer)
Songs written by Michael Simpson (producer)